Fisher's z-distribution is the statistical distribution of half the logarithm of an F-distribution variate:

 

It was first described by Ronald Fisher in a paper delivered at the International Mathematical Congress of 1924 in Toronto. Nowadays one usually uses the F-distribution instead.

However, the mean and variance do not follow the same transformation.

The probability density function is
 
where B is the beta function.

When the degrees of freedom becomes large the distribution approaches normality with mean
 
and variance

Related distribution
If  then  (F-distribution)
If  then

References

External links 
 MathWorld entry

Continuous distributions